Zack Eskridge (born January 19, 1988) is a former arena football/Canadian football quarterback.

College career
He played college football at Midwestern State University and Texas Christian University.

Senior (2010):

Earned All-Lone Star Conference South Division second-team honors after starting 10 games at quarterback.

Passed for 1,976 yards completing 175 of 282 passes with 17 touchdowns and six interceptions.

Ranked 44th in NCAA Division II and fourth in the LSC with a pass efficiency rating of 136.55.

Rated 43rd in NCAA Division II and sixth in the LSC averaging 230.1 yards of total offense a game.

Ran for 325 yards on 61 attempts for an average of 5.3 yards per carry with four touchdowns.

Passed for 200-or-more yards on five occasions in 2010 including a season-best 317 yards on 27-of-37 passing with three touchdowns in a 38–31 overtime victory over Incarnate Word on Oct. 2, 2010.

Ran for a career-high 137 yards in a 52–6 win at Eastern New Mexico on Sep. 11, 2010.

Completed a touchdown pass in each of his 10 games as a senior to extend his consecutive games with a TD pass to 26.

He completed a touchdown pass in 29 of 31 career games at MSU.

Finished career topping numerous Midwestern State records including Passing Yards (6,953), Touchdown Passes (64), Completions (570), Passing Attempts (867), Completion Percentage (65.7), Pass Efficiency Rating (152.9), 300-yard Passing Games (6) and 200-yard Passing Games (21).

2010 Honors and Awards:

- 2010 All-Lone Star Conference South Division Second-team

- 2010 Lone Star Conference Division Academic Player of the Year

Junior (2009):

Named Harlon Hill Trophy finalist after starting each of MSU's 12 games at quarterback leading the Mustangs to their first Lone Star Conference championship and third trip to the NCAA Division II postseason.

Set MSU single season records for passing yards (3,295), passing touchdowns (29), completion percentage (71.3), pass efficiency rating (180.2), completions (236), average yards per pass (10.0) and passing yards per game (274.6).
Led all of NCAA Division II with a 180.2 pass efficiency rating.

Broke 33-year-old NCAA Division II record for highest percentage of passes completed in a single game with a minimum of 20 passes at 96 percent after completing 24-of-25 passes for 245 yards and two touchdowns in a 38–7 win over No. 6 Texas A&M-Kingsville on Oct. 17th.

Connected for four touchdowns against Northeastern State, Incarnate Word and Tarleton State.

Passed for at least 200 yards and a touchdown in each of MSU's 12 games including four games of 300 yards or more.

Connected on 26-of-37 passes for a season-high 356 yards and four touchdowns in a 50–17 win on Oct. 31 at Eastern New Mexico.

Hit 15-of-20 passes for 339 yards and three touchdowns in a 43–16 victory over Central Oklahoma on Oct. 24.
Connected on 20-of-30 passes for 334 yards and four scores in a close 49–7 win at Incarnate Word on Sep. 19th.

Passed for 345 yards on 20-of-32 passes and a touchdown against Angelo State on Sep. 26.

2009 Honors and Awards:

- 2009 Harlon Hill Trophy Finalist

- 2009 D2Football.com All America Honorable Mention

- 2009 Don Hansen's Football Gazette All America Honorable Mention

- 2009 Daktronics Super Region 4 Offensive Player of the Year

- 2009 Daktronics All-Super Region 4 First-team

- 2009 Hansen's Football Gazette All-Super Region 4 First-team

- 2009 LSC South Division Offensive Player of the Year

- 2009 All-LSC South Division First-team

- 2009 LSC South Division Academic Player of the Year

- 2009 ESPN The Magazine/CoSIDA Academic All-District 6

- LSC South Division Offensive Player of the Week (Sep. 7, 2009)

- D2Football.com National Offensive Player of the Week (Oct. 21, 2009)

Sophomore (2008):

Started nine games at quarterback.

Passed for 1,682 yards and a school single season record 18 touchdowns.

Completed school record 62.6 percent of his passes (159 of 254).

Seventh in Lone Star Conference with 186.9 passing yards per game.

Fourth in LSC in pass efficiency rating at 135.3.
Set MSU single-game record with 34 completions for a season-best 325 yards and four touchdowns at Central Oklahoma on Oct. 25, 2008.

Set school single-game record with six touchdowns while completing 22-of-29 passes for 295 yards against Eastern New Mexico on Nov. 1, 2008.

Passed for more than 200 yards in four-straight games from Oct. 11 – Nov. 1, 2008.

Completed 15 touchdown passes over final four games of the 2008 campaign.

2008 Honors and Awards:

- LSC South Division Offensive Player of the Week (Nov. 3, 2008)

At TCU:

Redshirt Freshman (2007):

Served as squadman for Horned Frogs.

Freshman (2006):

Redshirted as a true freshman.

Ran scout team offense.

Professional career

Dallas Cowboys
He was signed by the Dallas Cowboys as an undrafted free agent in 2011.

Toronto Argonauts
Eskridge signed with the Toronto Argonauts, of the Canadian Football League, in 2011.

Kansas City Command
Eskridge signed with the Kansas City Command, of the Arena Football League, in 2012. Eskridge made his professional debut for the Command.

New Orleans VooDoo
Eskridge joined the New Orleans VooDoo for the 2013 season. Eskridge was released 10 weeks into the season.

San Jose SaberCats
Eskridge was assigned to the San Jose SaberCats on June 6, 2013. He was reassigned by the SaberCats on June 17, 2013.

References

Dallas Cowboys players
1988 births
Living people
American football quarterbacks
Midwestern State Mustangs football players
Kansas City Command players
New Orleans VooDoo players
San Jose SaberCats players